Aino Marjatta Henssen (12 April 1925, Elberfeld – 29 August 2011, Marburg), was a German lichenologist and systematist. Her father, Gottfried Henssen, was a folklorist and her mother was Finnish.

Education and career
Henssen began her studies in Biology in Freiburg, Germany, before continuing in Marburg, Germany. She obtained her doctorate in 1953, which focused on the physiology of Spirodela polyrhiza. In 1963, she became the curator of the Botanisches Institut at Philipps-Universität in Marburg, Germany. Following her habilitation in 1965, she was appointed in 1970 to the position of Associate Professor for thallophyte studies. She retired in 1990.

Contributions
Henssen made many advancements to the taxonomic knowledge of cyanolichens and wrote a textbook on the subject. This book reorganized the taxonomic classification and connected lichen families to evolutionary clades. She later focused on actinomycetes during her postdoctoral at the Institute for Bacteriology in Berlin, leading to the discovery of two new genera, Pseudonocardia Henssen and Thermomonospora Henssen. She was passionate towards her field work, which took her around the world to collect specimens. Over the years, Henssen published many scientific articles on topics relating to lichens, fungi and the systematics of these groups. She has been credited for having introduced the term  in a 1963 publication, referring to a specific type of  characteristic of the family Lichinaceae.

Recognition
Henssen was given a scholarship from the American Association of University Women. In 1992, she was honored with an Acharius Medal.

Eponymy
Several lichens have been named to honour Henssen, including: Ainoa which is a genus of lichens in the family Baeomycetaceae . And also the species of; Caloplaca hensseniana ; Diploschistes hensseniae ; Gyalidea hensseniae ; Lecanora hensseniae ; Nephroma hensseniae ; Parmotrema hensseniae ; Rhizocarpon hensseniae ; Rimularia hensseniae ; Stephanocyclos henssenianus ; and Xanthoparmelia hensseniae .

See also
 :Category:Taxa named by Aino Henssen

References

External links 

 Biography at lichenology.org

20th-century German botanists
German lichenologists
1925 births
2011 deaths
Acharius Medal recipients
German people of Finnish descent
20th-century German women scientists
People from Elberfeld
Scientists from Wuppertal
Women lichenologists
German women botanists